Aulnay is the name or part of the name of several communes in France:

 Aulnay, Aube, in the Aube département
 Aulnay, Charente-Maritime, in the Charente-Maritime département
 Aulnay, Vienne, in the Vienne département
 Aulnay-l'Aître, in the Marne département
 Aulnay-la-Rivière, in the Loiret département
 Aulnay-sous-Bois, in the Seine-Saint-Denis département
 Aulnay-sur-Iton, in the Eure département
 Aulnay-sur-Marne, in the Marne département
 Aulnay-sur-Mauldre, in the Yvelines département

See also
 D'Aulnay (disambiguation)
 D'Aulnoy